Tuomas Tuokkola (born January 20, 1970) is a Finnish former ice hockey defenceman. He is currently the head coach of KooKoo in the Finnish Liiga.

Tuokkola took over the head coaching duties for Ilves on January 21, 2013, as a mid-season replacement for Raimo Helminen.

References

External links

1970 births
Living people
Finnish ice hockey coaches
Finnish ice hockey defencemen
People from Alavus
Sportspeople from South Ostrobothnia